Kelloggia is a plant genus in the bedstraw and madder family, Rubiaceae.

Species
The Plant List and the World Checklist of Selected Plant Families recognise 2 accepted species:

 Kelloggia chinensis  
 Kelloggia galioides

References

Rubieae
Rubiaceae genera